Carlijn is a Dutch feminine given name that is a diminutive form of Carolina and Caroline. Notable people with the name include:

Carlijn Achtereekte (born 1990), Dutch speed skater
Carlijn Bouten (born 1967), Dutch professor of Cell-Matrix Interactions
Carlijn de Groot (born 1986), Dutch cricketer
Carlijn Jans (born 1987), Dutch female volleyball player
Carlijn Schoutens (born 1994), Dutch-American speed skater
Carlijn Welten (born 1987), Dutch field hockey player

See also

Karlijn

Notes

Dutch feminine given names